Ceuthomadarus is a genus of moth in the family Lecithoceridae.

Species
 Ceuthomadarus atlantis (Gozmány, 1978)
 Ceuthomadarus chthoniopa (Meyrick, 1936)
 Ceuthomadarus derrai Gozmány, 2002
 Ceuthomadarus funebrella (Chrétien, 1922)
 Ceuthomadarus naumanni (Gozmány, 1987)
 Ceuthomadarus rungsi (Lucas, 1937)
 Ceuthomadarus tenebrionellus Mann, 1864
 Ceuthomadarus viduellus Rebel, 1903

References

Bibliography
Natural History Museum Lepidoptera genus database

Ceuthomadarinae
Moth genera